Panorpodes is a genus of scorpionflies in the family Panorpodidae, containing the following species:

 Panorpodes brachypodus Tan & Hua, 2008
 Panorpodes brevicaudatus (Hua, 1998)
 Panorpodes colei Byers, 2005
 Panorpodes komaensis Okamoto, 1925
 Panorpodes kuandianensis Zhong, Zhang & Hua, 2011
 Panorpodes maculata Miyamoto, 1984
 Panorpodes paradoxa MacLachlan, 1875
 Panorpodes pulchra Issiki, 1927
 †Panorpodes brevicauda Baltic amber, Priabonian

 †Panorpodes gedanensis, Baltic amber, Priabonian
 †Panorpodes hageni, Baltic amber, Priabonian
 †Panorpodes weitschati Baltic amber, Priabonian

References

Mecoptera
Insect genera